The CONCACAF Semi-final Round of the CONCACAF zone of the 2002 FIFA World Cup qualification, was contested between the 12 remaining teams of the qualification process. The teams were divided into 3 groups of 4 teams each. They would play against each other on a home-and-away basis. The group winners and runners-up would advance to the Final Round.

Group 1

Group 2

Group 3

Play-off

External links
FIFA official page
RSSSF - 2002 World Cup Qualification
Allworldcup

3
Qual
Qual
Q1
Q1
Q1

de:Fußball-Weltmeisterschaft 2002/Qualifikation#CONCACAF Zwischenrunde
es:Clasificación de Concacaf para la Copa Mundial de Fútbol de 2002#Segunda fase
ko:2002년 FIFA 월드컵 북아메리카 지역 예선#준결승라운드

lt:XVII pasaulio futbolo čempionato atranka#Pusfinalis
ru:Чемпионат мира по футболу 2002 (отборочный турнир, КОНКАКАФ)#Второй этап